Precaffrocrambus is a genus of moths of the family Crambidae. It contains only one species, Precaffrocrambus manyarae, which is found in Tanzania.

References

Crambinae
Crambidae genera